Ma'arin is a village in northern Aleppo Governorate, northwestern Syria.

The village administratively belongs to Nahiya Azaz in Azaz District. Nearby localities include Al-Krum at the opposite side of Mount Barsa,  to the north, and Al-Salameh  to the east. In the 2004 census, Ma'arin had a population of 334.

Demographics
Ma'arin is a Turkmen village. In late 19th century, traveler Martin Hartmann noted Ma'arin as a Turkish village, then located in the Ottoman nahiyah of Azaz-i Turkman.

References

Populated places in Azaz District
Syria–Turkey relations
Turkmen communities in Syria